Haldia Institute of Dental Sciences and Research (HIDSAR) is a private dental college located in Haldia, in the Indian state of West Bengal. It is affiliated with the West Bengal University of Health Sciences and is recognized by Dental Council of India. It offers Bachelor of Dental Surgery (BDS) and Master of Dental Surgery (MDS) courses.

Courses offered
Haldia Institute of Dental Sciences and Research conducts an undergraduate program of four years followed by one year of internship which leads to a Bachelor of Dental Surgery (BDS) degree and the postgraduate program of three years leads to a Master of Dental Surgery (MDS) degree. MDS is offered in the following specialties:

 Prosthodontics and Crown & Bridge
 Oral and Maxillofacial Surgery 
 Oral Medicine & Radiology
 Conservative Dentistry & Endodontics
 Orthodontics & Dentofacial Orthopedics
 Periodontics
 Pedodontics & Preventive Dentistry

Admission
The institution enrolls undergraduates on the basis of their NEET UG scores and admits postgraduates on the basis of their scores in the NEET MDS conducted by NBE (National Board of Examination) held annually.

Attached Medical College & Hospital
The ICARE Institute of Medical Sciences and Research & B. C. Roy Hospital (IIMSAR & BCRH) attached to our Dental College is situated in the same campus in Banbishnupur, Balughata, Haldia, set in the serene 25-acre campus with college building having an area of about 1,00,000 sq feet and a 500 bedded multispeciality hospital named Dr. B. C. Roy hospital.

The pre and paraclinical medical subjects, as well as clinical medical subjects for the BDS students, are taught in this medical college and hospital.

References

 Dental colleges in India
 Universities and colleges in Purba Medinipur district
 Affiliates of West Bengal University of Health Sciences
 2007 establishments in West Bengal
 Educational institutions established in 2007